Kosva is a rural locality (a village) in Oshibskoye Rural Settlement, Kudymkarsky District, Perm Krai, Russia. The population was 17 as of 2010.

Geography 
Kosva is located 34 km northeast of Kudymkar (the district's administrative centre) by road. Oshib is the nearest rural locality.

References 

Rural localities in Kudymkarsky District